The 3rd Infantry Battalion is one of the three infantry battalions, along with the b1k and b2k, part of the Albanian Land Force. The b3k it is based in Poshnjë, Berat County. It consists of 3 companies, with 100 – 130 soldiers each, with a total of around 700 effective as a whole battalion. Normally they fall under the command of Land Force Command and Staff.

See also
 Albanian Armed Forces
 Albanian Land Force
 Albanian Naval Force
 Albanian Air Force

References

Military units and formations of Albania